Idiomarina aquimaris is a Gram-negative, aerobic, rod-shaped and motile bacterium from the genus of Idiomarina which has been isolated from the coral Isopora palifera from Taiwan.

References

Bacteria described in 2012
Alteromonadales